The Australian cricket team toured England in the 1989 season to play a six-match Test series against England.  The tour also included matches in Wales, Scotland, the Netherlands and Denmark. Australia won the series 4–0 with two matches drawn.  Australia therefore regained The Ashes.

Touring party

Allan Border (captain)
Geoff Marsh (vice captain)
Terry Alderman
David Boon
Greg Campbell
Ian Healy
Trevor Hohns
Merv Hughes
Dean Jones
Geoff Lawson
Tim May
Tom Moody
Carl Rackemann
Mark Taylor
Mike Veletta
Steve Waugh
Tim Zoehrer

Test series summary

 1st Test at Headingley – Australia won by 210 runs
 2nd Test at Lord's Cricket Ground – Australia won by 6 wickets
 3rd Test at Edgbaston – match drawn	
 4th Test at Old Trafford – Australia won by 9 wickets
 5th Test at Trent Bridge – Australia won by an innings and 180 runs
 6th Test at The Oval – match drawn

One Day Internationals (ODIs)

The series was drawn 1–1 with one tied match. By losing fewer wickets in the tied game, England won the Texaco Trophy.

1st ODI

2nd ODI

3rd ODI

The coach driver for the touring Australian cricket team in 1989 was Austin Grundy. The Australian scorer was Mike Walsh.

Other matches
 Australians v League Cricket Conference XI at Dartmouth, 5 May 1989
 Australians v Duchess of Norfolk's XI at Arundel, 7 May 1989
 Sussex v Australians at Hove, 9 May 1989
 Marylebone Cricket Club v Australians at Lord's, 11 May 1989
 Worcestershire v Australians at Worcester, 13–14 May 1989
 Somerset v Australians at Taunton, 17–19 May 1989
 Middlesex v Australians at Lord's, 20–22 May 1989
 Yorkshire v Australians at Leeds, 23 May 1989

First-class match: Warwickshire v Australians at Birmingham

 Derbyshire v Australians at Derby, 3-5 Jun 1989
 Lancashire v Australians at Manchester, 14-16 Jun 1989
 Northamptonshire v Australians at Northampton, 17-19 Jun 1989
 Australians v Oxford and Cambridge Universities at The Parks, 28 Jun 1989
 Glamorgan v Australians at Neath, 1-3 Jul 1989
 Australians v Scotland at Glasgow, 15 Jul 1989
 Australians v Minor Counties at Trowbridge, 17 Jul 1989
 Hampshire v Australians at Southampton, 19-21 Jul 1989
 Gloucestershire v Australians at Bristol, 22-23 Jul 1989
 Nottinghamshire v Australians at Nottingham, 2-4 Aug 1989
 Leicestershire v Australians at Leicester, 5-7 Aug 1989
 Kent v Australians at Canterbury, 16-18 Aug 1989
 Essex v Australians at Chelmsford, 19-21 Aug 1989
 Australians v The Netherlands at The Hague, 2 Sep 1989
 Australians v The Netherlands at The Hague, 3 Sep 1989
 Australians v Denmark at Bronsby Stadium, 5 Sep 1989
 Australians v Denmark at Slagelse Stadium, 6 Sep 1989

Annual reviews
 Playfair Cricket Annual 1990
 Wisden Cricketers' Almanack 1990

References

External links
 CricketArchive – tour itineraries

1989 in Australian cricket
Cricket season
1989
International cricket competitions from 1988–89 to 1991
1989